Marco Chiesa (born 10 October 1974) is a Swiss politician who has presided over the Swiss People's Party (SVP/UDC) since 2020. He served as a member of the Grand Council of Ticino from 2007 to 2015 and National Council from 2015 to 2019. Chiesa has been a member of the Council of States since 2019.

Biography
Chiesa was born in Lugano in 1974. His father was a street maintenance worker and he grew up in the Molino Nuovo section of the city. He graduated from the University of Fribourg with a degree in business administration.

After college, he worked as a tax advisor and banking expert.  However, his career shifted when he became the manager of a retirement home in the Italian speaking region of Grisons.  He entered politics as a member of the municipal council of Villa Luganese.  In 2007, he was elected to the Grand Council of Ticino.  He won a seat in the National Council in 2015 and served one term.  In the 2019, he finished second in the first round of voting behind incumbent Filippo Lombardi. With no candidates taking an absolute majority in the first round, the election went to a second round where Chiesa and Marina Carobbio Guscetti surprised with a win over, Lombardi and Giovanni Merlini.  Chiesa became the first member of the SVP to represent Ticino in the Council of States and, with the defeat of Merlini, was the first time in more than a century that FDP.The Liberals and its predecessor, the FDP, did not elect one of its members from Ticino.

Chiesa was elected to his party's vice presidency in 2018. In 2019, he was mentioned as a possible successor to outgoing SVP president Albert Rösti; however, he initially rejected the overtures as his management of the retirement home did not allow him to take on another position.  He later resigned from the center, which opened up the possibility of his nomination. In July 2020, a selection committee of the SVP tasked with nominating a new party president named Chiesa as its preferred candidate for the post.  Andreas Glarner withdrew in favor of Chiesa.  Before the election, Alfred Heer also withdrew. Chiesa was formally elected as the party president on 22 August 2020.

Chiesa has been described as being very close to former SVP power broker Christoph Blocher.  He has supported changes to Switzerland's bilateral treaties with the European Union with regard to immigration.  He has criticized uncontrolled immigration as being responsible for traffic jams, higher housing costs and unfair competition for workers.

He speaks Italian and French fluently and can speak German well.

References

External links

Biographical entry on the Federal Parliament website 
Personal homepage 

1974 births
Living people
People from Ticino
Swiss People's Party politicians
Members of the National Council (Switzerland)
Members of the Council of States (Switzerland)
University of Fribourg alumni